For the Love of God is a sculpture of a diamond-encrusted human skull by artist Damien Hirst.

For the Love of God may also refer to:

 For the Love of God (instrumental), a song by Steve Vai
 For the Love of God (2007 film), a short animated film starring Steve Coogan and Ian McKellen
For the Love of God (2011 film),  a Canadian drama film
For the Love of God (documentary), a 2015 documentary
 For uses in religion, see love of God